Mikhaylovka is a rural locality (a selo) and the administrative center of Tashtimerovsky Selsoviet, Abzelilovsky District, Bashkortostan, Russia. The population was 1,103 as of 2010. There are 15 streets.

Geography 
Mikhaylovka is located 27 km northeast of Askarovo (the district's administrative centre) by road. Tashtimerovo is the nearest rural locality.

References 

Rural localities in Abzelilovsky District